Royal Haven (foaled  April 30, 1992 ) is an American Thoroughbred racehorse and the winner of the 1997 A Phenomenon Handicap.

Career

Royal Haven won his first career start on May 18, 1995 at Pimlico Race Course. By the end of August, he had picked up three other non-graded non-stakes wins. He competed in the 1995 Pennsylvania Derby coming in 2nd place. He earned his first stakes win in the 1997 Toboggan Stakes. He then picked up the biggest win of his career in the 1997 A Phenomenon Handicap. He had dual third-place finishes at the 1997 Forego Handicap and the 1997 Forest Hills Handicap. He then went on a three race win streak. He won the Fall Highweight Handicap on November 27, 1997. He then won the December 27th, 1997 Gravesend Handicap. He finished the streak off with a win at the February 16th, 1998 General George Handicap. He then finished off his career with a second-place finish at Belmont Park on October 4, 1998.

Pedigree

References

1992 racehorse births